You're Invited to Mary-Kate & Ashley's is a musical direct-to-video series starring Mary-Kate and Ashley Olsen. The videos were released between 1995 and 2000 and have since been released on VHS in 2000-2001 and on DVD in 2003.

The series began with You're Invited to Mary-Kate & Ashley's Sleepover Party and ended with You're Invited to Mary-Kate & Ashley's School Dance Party and three more compilation releases.

List of releases

Original releases

You're Invited to Mary-Kate & Ashley's Sleepover Party (1995)
In You're Invited to Mary-Kate & Ashley's Sleepover Party, Mary-Kate, Ashley, and their slumber party guests dance around, tell scary stories, play video games, order a pizza, and try to pull an all-nighter. The pizza, ordered with nothing on it, is topped with a variety of ingredients sourced from their refrigerator during their freestyle rap "Gimme Pizza". A slowed-down version of the song later gained popularity in the 2010s.

Cast
Mary-Kate and Ashley Olsen - Themselves
Trent Olsen - Himself
Cara DeLizia - Cara
Brighton Hertford - Brighton
Vanessa Croft - Vanessa
Jimmy Higa - Boy #1 
Troy Davidson - Boy #2
Note: This is the only episode to not include bloopers at the end.

Songs
Dare to Dance
Brother For Sale 
Video Monster
Very, Very, Very Unbelievably Scary
Gimme Pizza
Pullin' An All Nighter

You're Invited to Mary-Kate & Ashley's Hawaiian Beach Party (1996)
In You're Invited to Mary-Kate & Ashley's Hawaiian Beach Party, the twins are tired from school and their busy lives so they decide to throw a beach party. They, along with their friends, travel to Hawaii in a submarine where they play in the water, build a sandcastle, and go surfing together.

Cast
Mary-Kate and Ashley Olsen - Themselves
Taylor Scheer - Cheryl
Mariah Seneca - Nicole
Venus Lee - Jenny

Songs
We Need a Vacation
Wild, Wet, Wacky, Wonderful World
Sand, Sand, Glorious Sand
I'd Rather be Surfing
Note: This aired on Fox Family in 2000.

You're Invited to Mary-Kate & Ashley's Birthday Party (1997)
In You're Invited to Mary-Kate & Ashley's Birthday Party, it's Mary-Kate and Ashley's birthday but the twins can't decide what to do for their birthday party. After imagining party ideas such as a Moon Bounce party, pool and piñata party, and a makeover party, they decide to take their friends to Six Flags.

Cast
Mary-Kate and Ashley Olsen - Themselves
Ashley Hicks - Belinda
Nicole Mancera - Lisa
Bluejean Ashley Secrist - Jill
John Dultz - Eric
Jesse Joseph Rambis - Jamie
Ginger - Clue

Songs
Moon Bounce Madness
Pool Party
Piñata Party
Makeover Machine
Scary Rides

You're Invited to Mary-Kate & Ashley's Christmas Party (1997)
In You're Invited to Mary-Kate & Ashley's Christmas Party, Mary-Kate and Ashley celebrate Christmas with a party. They bake cookies, sing Christmas songs, make ornaments for and decorate the Christmas tree, reminisce over Mary-Kate and Ashley's ski vacation in Vail, Colorado, open presents, and even get a few visits from Santa Claus!

Cast
Mary-Kate and Ashley Olsen - Themselves
Sara Paxton - Patty
Christel Khalil  - Diana
Jessyca Gomer - Elizabeth
Richard Taylor Olsen - Seth
Bobby Edner - Chip
Ginger - Clue
Donovan Scott - Santa Claus

Songs
Cookies
Jingle Bells Rap
Goin' Super Fast
Giving is Getting
We Wish You a Merry Christmas

You're Invited to Mary-Kate & Ashley's Mall Party (1997)
In You're Invited to Mary-Kate & Ashley's Mall Party, it's a rainy day and Mary-Kate and Ashley are bored. Luckily, their cousin invites them and their friends to go to the Mall of America with her. They fly a plane there where they go shopping, beat a few boys in mini golf, eat in the food court, and join the boys in their concert.

Cast
Mary-Kate and Ashley Olsen - Themselves
Jamie Green - Jamie
Jessica Bell - Jena
Angelica Chitwood - Claire
Graham Ballou - Nick
Lance Bonner - Evan
Michael Benoy - Band Member
Amanda Gould - Band Member

Songs
Meet You at the Mall
Toys (When I Grow Up)
Food Court
Decisions, Decisions
Instant Party

You're Invited to Mary-Kate & Ashley's Ballet Party (1997)
In You're Invited to Mary-Kate & Ashley's Ballet Party, the twins travel to New York to have the perfect ballet party. They visit the New York State Theatre, meet a real ballerina with some magic who teaches them about ballet, travel around New York, and perform in a grand performance.

Cast
Mary-Kate and Ashley Olsen - Themselves
Eva Natanya - Danielle
Amanda Edge - Jacqueline
Sant'gria Bello - Eric
Sarah Hay - Stephanie
Sumaya Jackson - Dana

Songs
Dancing Your Dreams
Practice, Practice, Practice
Sore Feet
Butterflies in Your Stomach
Tchaikovsky Medley

You're Invited to Mary-Kate & Ashley's Camp Out Party (1998)
In You're Invited to Mary-Kate & Ashley's Camp Out Party, Mary-Kate and Ashley take their friends out in the backyard for a camping trip. They set up camp, look around at nature, go fishing, and tell scary stories at night, and toast marshmallows and eat pizza.

Cast
Mary-Kate and Ashley Olsen - Themselves
Nanea Miyata - Katherine
Paige Segal - Alexandra

Songs
Just the Bare Necessities
Come On
Critters on My Crackers
Raptor in the Woods

You're Invited to Mary-Kate & Ashley's Costume Party (1998)
In You're Invited to Mary-Kate & Ashley's Costume Party, Mary-Kate and Ashley look back at fashion over time in the 1950s, 1960s, 1970s, and 1980s before deciding on having a "come as you are" party (where you go to the party dressing in whatever you're wearing when you get the invite) with their friends.

Cast
Mary-Kate and Ashley Olsen - Themselves
Victoria Gregson - Emily
Mimi Paley - Mia
Zack Hopkins - Mark
Niles Calloway - Zach
Rafael Rojas III - Matt

Songs
Ice Cream Crazy
Goin' Through Our Mom's Stuff
Honky Tonk Hip Hop
Come As You Are

You're Invited to Mary-Kate & Ashley's Fashion Party (1999)
In You're Invited to Mary-Kate & Ashley's Fashion Party, the twins and their friends have a little fashion show before they are invited to visit a fashion college at the Fashion Institute of Design & Merchandising. They get to learn about fashion, design their own outfits, and even get to join in a real fashion show.

Cast
Mary-Kate and Ashley Olsen - Themselves
Joanna Flores - Madison
Erin Mackey - Jenna
Justin Taylor - Justin
Adam Duro - Ryan
Louis Lotorto - Mr. Richardson
Becky Israel - Kiera

Songs
I'm Still Me
Fashion Jr. High
We're Gonna Start Something New
It's Not Me - It's You

You're Invited to Mary-Kate & Ashley's School Dance Party (2000)
In You're Invited to Mary-Kate and Ashley's School Dance Party, Mary-Kate and Ashley help set up for the school's dance, which is Spring Dance.com. Ashley worries if her boyfriend and her will be the King and Queen of Cyberspace while Mary-Kate struggles with trying to ask her crush out. Mary-Kate asks him and he says yes. Ashley loses Queen of Cyberspace to Kelly Benton while her boyfriend gets to be King but he reassures her that he still loves her the best.

Cast
Mary-Kate and Ashley Olsen - Themselves
Blake Bashoff - Jesse
Chez Starbuck - Rick Morgan
Shannon Chandler - Betsy
Lauren Maltby - Erica
Danielle Wiener - Brianna
Note: School Dance Party VHS release also includes "Our Music Video", a collection of the twins' favorite music videos. This is also the only episode to not have the theme song.

Songs
Monday Morning
The Waiting Game
Saturday Night
Noise About Boys

Compilation releases
 You're Invited to Mary-Kate & Ashley's Greatest Parties (2000)
Includes Sleepover Party, Birthday Party, and Mall Party

 You're Invited to Mary-Kate & Ashley's Favorite Parties (2001)
Includes Fashion Party, Costume Party, and Camp Out Party

 You're Invited to Mary-Kate & Ashley's Vacation Parties (2001)
Includes Hawaiian Beach Party, Ballet Party, and Christmas Party

 Mary-Kate and Ashley's Christmas Collection (2001)
Includes Christmas Party, The Case of the Christmas Caper, and The Case of the Mystery Cruise

References

External links
 IMDB

Direct-to-video film series
Children's film series
1990s musical films
2000s musical films
Mary-Kate and Ashley Olsen
Films about twin sisters
American children's films
1990s children's films
2000s children's films
1990s American films
2000s American films